Hoyt Wayne Axton (March 25, 1938 – October 26, 1999) was an American singer-songwriter, guitarist, and actor. He became prominent in the early 1960s, establishing himself on the West Coast as a folk singer with an earthy style and powerful voice. Among his best-known songs are "Joy to the World", "The Pusher", "No No Song", "Greenback Dollar", "Della and the Dealer", and "Never Been to Spain".

He was a prolific character actor, appearing in dozens of film and television roles over several decades, memorably as a father figure in a number of films, including The Black Stallion (1979) and Gremlins (1984).

Early life
Born in Duncan, Oklahoma, Axton spent his preteen years in Comanche, Oklahoma, with his brother, John. His mother, Mae Boren Axton, a songwriter, co-wrote the classic rock 'n' roll song "Heartbreak Hotel", which became a major hit for Elvis Presley. Some of Hoyt's own songs were later recorded by Presley. Axton's father, John Thomas Axton, was a naval officer stationed in Jacksonville, Florida; the family joined him there in 1949.

Axton graduated from Robert E. Lee High School in 1956 and left town after Knauer's Hardware Store burned down on graduation night, a prank gone wrong.

He attended Oklahoma State University on a scholarship, and he played football for the school, but he left to enlist in the US Navy. In the Navy, Axton held the rank of petty officer second class and served on two ships, the USS Princeton (CV-37) and the USS Ranger (CVA-61).

Axton was the first cousin of David Boren, who served as governor of Oklahoma and three terms in the United States Senate, and as president of the University of Oklahoma.

Career
After his discharge from the Navy, Axton began singing folk songs in coffee houses and nightclubs in Southern California. In the early 1960s, he released his first folk album, The Balladeer (recorded at The Troubadour), which included his song "Greenback Dollar". It became a 1963 hit for The Kingston Trio.

Axton released numerous albums throughout the 1960s and '70s. He produced Tales From The Ozone, a 1975 album by Commander Cody and His Lost Planet Airmen, and he had many minor hits of his own, such as "Boney Fingers", "When the Morning Comes", and 1979's "Della and the Dealer". His vocal style featured his distinctive bass-baritone (which later deepened to near-bass) and use of characterization. 

Axton first appeared on television in a David L. Wolper ABC production of The Story of a Folksinger (1963). He appeared on Hootenanny, hosted by Jack Linkletter, during this period. In 1965, he was in an episode of Bonanza where he sang duets with Pernell Roberts. In 1966, he made his film debut in the film Smoky playing the role of Fred Denton, the evil brother of the character played by actor Fess Parker.  He became well known in the 1970s and 1980s through his film roles, including The Black Stallion (1979), Heart Like a Wheel (1983), and Gremlins (1984). His television appearances included WKRP In Cincinnati (1979) and Diff'rent Strokes (1984, 1985). In 1980, he sang the theme song to the short-lived series Flo, and he appeared in the episode "You Gotta Have Hoyt". Axton sang the jingle "The Ballad of Big Mac", touting McDonald's Big Mac onscreen in a 1969 commercial he filmed for the hamburger franchise, as well as "Head For the Mountains" in voice-overs for Busch Beer in the 1980s. He appeared in a Pizza Hut commercial in 1985, and in a TV spot for FTD Florists with Merlin Olsen in 1989.

Axton's most lasting contributions were songs made famous by others: "Joy to the World" (Three Dog Night) and "Never Been to Spain" (Three Dog Night, Elvis Presley); "Greenback Dollar" (the Kingston Trio); "The Pusher" and "Snowblind Friend" (Steppenwolf); "No No Song" (Ringo Starr); and an array of other songs covered by singers such as Joan Baez, Arlo Guthrie, John Denver, Nina Simone, Waylon Jennings, Martha Reeves, Jonathan Edwards, Glen Campbell, and Anne Murray. Axton sang duets with Linda Ronstadt on the songs "Lion in the Winter" and "When the Morning Comes" (a top-40 country hit), and with Tanya Tucker on "You Taught Me How To Cry." His composition "Joy to the World", as performed by Three Dog Night, was number one on the charts for six straight weeks in 1971, making it the top hit of the year. He named his record label Jeremiah after the bullfrog mentioned in the song.

Personal life and death
Axton was married four times; the first three ended in divorce. He had five children.

Axton struggled with cocaine addiction, and several of his songs, including "The Pusher", "Snowblind Friend", and "No No Song", partly reflect his negative drug experiences. His wife later explained that she offered Axton marijuana to relieve his pain and stress following his 1995 stroke. They were fined and given deferred sentences. Axton never fully recovered from his stroke, and he used a wheelchair much of the time afterwards. Axton died at age 61 at his home in Victor, Montana, on October 26, 1999, after suffering two heart attacks in two weeks.

On November 1, 2007, Axton and his mother Mae were both inducted posthumously into the Oklahoma Music Hall of Fame in Muskogee, Oklahoma.

Discography

Albums
{| class="wikitable"
|-
! rowspan="2"| Year
! rowspan="2"| Album
! colspan="3"| Chart positions
! rowspan="2"| Label
|-
! style="width:45px;"| US Country
! style="width:45px;"| US
! style="width:45px;"| CAN Country
|-
| 1962
| The Balladeer
| style="text-align:center;"| —
| style="text-align:center;"| —
| style="text-align:center;"| —
| Horizon
|-
| 1963
| Greenback Dollar
| style="text-align:center;"| —
| style="text-align:center;"| —
| style="text-align:center;"| —
| Horizon
|-
| 1963
| Thunder'n Lightnin'''
| style="text-align:center;"| —
| style="text-align:center;"| —
| style="text-align:center;"| —
| Horizon
|-
| 1963
| Saturday's Child| style="text-align:center;"| —
| style="text-align:center;"| —
| style="text-align:center;"| —
| Horizon
|-
| 1964
| Hoyt Axton Explodes!| style="text-align:center;"| —
| style="text-align:center;"| —
| style="text-align:center;"| —
| Vee Jay
|-
| 1964
| Long Old Road| style="text-align:center;"| —
| style="text-align:center;"| —
| style="text-align:center;"| —
| Vee Jay
|-
| 1965
| Mr. Greenback Dollar Man| style="text-align:center;"| —
| style="text-align:center;"| —
| style="text-align:center;"| —
| Surrey
|-
| 1965
| Hoyt Axton Sings Bessie Smith| style="text-align:center;"| —
| style="text-align:center;"| —
| style="text-align:center;"| —
| Exodus
|-
| 1969
| My Griffin Is Gone| style="text-align:center;"| —
| style="text-align:center;"| —
| style="text-align:center;"| —
| Columbia
|-
| 1971
| Joy to the World| style="text-align:center;"| —
| style="text-align:center;"| —
| style="text-align:center;"| —
| Capitol
|-
| 1971
| Country Anthem| style="text-align:center;"| —
| style="text-align:center;"| —
| style="text-align:center;"| —
| Capitol
|-
| 1973
| Less Than the Song| style="text-align:center;"| —
| style="text-align:center;"| —
| style="text-align:center;"| —
| rowspan="4"| A&M
|-
| 1974
| Life Machine| style="text-align:center;"| 21
| style="text-align:center;"| —
| style="text-align:center;"| —
|-
| 1975
| Southbound| style="text-align:center;"| 27
| style="text-align:center;"| 188
| style="text-align:center;"| —
|-
| 1976
| Fearless| style="text-align:center;"| 26
| style="text-align:center;"| 171
| style="text-align:center;"| —
|-
| 1977
| Snowblind Friend| style="text-align:center;"| 36
| style="text-align:center;"| —
| style="text-align:center;"| —
| MCA
|-
| rowspan="2"| 1978
| Road Songs| style="text-align:center;"| 40
| style="text-align:center;"| —
| style="text-align:center;"| —
| A&M
|-
| Free Sailin'| style="text-align:center;"| 42
| style="text-align:center;"| —
| style="text-align:center;"| —
| MCA
|-
| 1979
| A Rusty Old Halo| style="text-align:center;"| 27
| style="text-align:center;"| —
| style="text-align:center;"| 14
| rowspan="4"| Jeremiah
|-
| 1980
| Where Did the Money Go?| style="text-align:center;"| 31
| style="text-align:center;"| —
| style="text-align:center;"| —
|-
| 1981
| Live!| style="text-align:center;"| 30
| style="text-align:center;"| —
| style="text-align:center;"| —
|-
| 1982
| Pistol Packin' Mama| style="text-align:center;"| 41
| style="text-align:center;"| —
| style="text-align:center;"| —
|-
| 1984
| American Dreams| style="text-align:center;"| —
| style="text-align:center;"| —
| style="text-align:center;"| —
| Global
|-
| 1990
| Spin of the Wheel| style="text-align:center;"| —
| style="text-align:center;"| —
| style="text-align:center;"| —
| DPI
|-
| 1996
| Jeremiah Was A Bullfrog| style="text-align:center;"| –
| style="text-align:center;"| –
| style="text-align:center;"| –
| Youngheart Music
|-
| 1998
| The A&M Years| style="text-align:center;"| —
| style="text-align:center;"| —
| style="text-align:center;"| —
|}

Singles

Music videos

Selected list of songs
Among Axton's best-known compositions (or co-writing credits) are:
 "Greenback Dollar" covered by The Kingston Trio
 "The Pusher", by Steppenwolf on their debut album, 1968; this version was also used in the soundtrack of the classic 1969 motion picture Easy Rider. Nina Simone recorded the song in 1971.
 "No No Song", which became a No. 3 hit for Ringo Starr in March 1975
 "Never Been To Spain", covered by Three Dog Night, Waylon Jennings, Elvis Presley, and many others
 "Joy to the World", the Three Dog Night hit from 1971 which held US No. 1 for six weeks
 "Snowblind Friend" (1971), covered by Steppenwolf
 "Lightning Bar Blues" (1973), covered by Brownsville Station, Linda Ronstadt, Arlo Guthrie, and Hanoi Rocks
 "Sweet Misery" (1974), covered by John Denver and Martha Reeves
 "When the Morning Comes" (1974)
 "You Taught Me How To Cry" (1977 duet with Tanya Tucker)
 "Boney Fingers" (1974), with Renee Armand
 "Jealous Man" (covered by John Fullbright)
 "Della and the Dealer" (1979), (performed on WKRP in Cincinnati; reached top 20 of the Billboard country chart in the U.S. and the top 50 of the British pop chart)
 "Evangelina", covered by Arlo Guthrie, Jonathan Edwards, Colter Wall, and others
 "Flash of Fire"
 "In a Young Girl's Mind" (covered by Johnny Cash)

"Della and the Dealer" became a minor hit in the UK after extensive playing by DJ Terry Wogan on his BBC Radio 2 breakfast program of the time.

Film and television appearances

Film appearances

 Smoky (1966) – Fred Denton
 The Black Stallion (1979) – Alec's Father
 Skinflint: A Country Christmas Carol (1979, TV Movie) – Cyrus Flint
 Cloud Dancer (1980) – Brad's Mechanic
 Liar's Moon (1982) – Cecil Duncan
 The Junkman (1982) – Himself / Cap. Gibbs / Rev. Jim Beam (voice)
 Endangered Species (1982) – Ben Morgan
 The Black Stallion Returns (1983) – Narrator (voice)
 Heart Like a Wheel (1983) – Tex Roque
 Deadline Auto Theft (1983) – Captain Gibbs
 Fred C. Dobbs Goes to Hollywood (1983)
 Gremlins (1984) – Randall Peltzer
 Act of Vengeance (1986, TV Movie) – Silous Huddleston
 Retribution (1987) – Lt. Ashley
 Christmas Comes to Willow Creek (1987, TV Movie) – Al Bensinger
 Guilty of Innocence: The Lenell Geter Story (1987, TV Movie) - Charlie Hartford
 Dixie Lanes (1988) – Clarence Laidlaw
 Disorganized Crime (1989) – Sheriff Henault
 We're No Angels (1989) – Father Levesque
 Buried Alive (1990, TV Movie) – Sheriff Sam Eberly
 Harmony Cats (1992) – Bill Stratton
 Space Case (1992) - Charlie
 Season of Change (1994) – Big Upton
 Kingfish: A Story of Huey P. Long (1995, TV Movie) – Huey P. Long, Sr.
 Number One Fan (1995) – Lt. Joe Halsey
 King Cobra (1999) – Mayor Ed Biddle (final film role)

Axton also contributed songs for the films The Legend of Hillbilly John (1972), Buster and Billie (1974) and Mitchell (1975).

Television appearancesThe Story of a Folksinger (TV special, 1963) - Himself
 Hootenanny (1964) – Himself / Himself – PerformerBonanza (1965, Series 06 Episode 27 "Dead And Gone") – Howard Mead
 Iron Horse (1966) – Slash Birney
 I Dream of Jeannie (1966, Season 02, Episode 07, "Fastest Gun In The East") – Bull
 The Hoyt Axton Country Western Boogie Woogie Gospel Rock and Roll Show (1975) – Himself. NBC TV special – 1 episode. Guests included Linda Ronstadt, Arlo Guthrie and Ringo Starr
 The Bionic Woman (1976) – Buck Buckley
 McCloud (1977) – Johnny Starbuck
 The Tonight Show Starring Johnny Carson (1979) – Himself – Musical Guest
 WKRP in Cincinnati (1979, performed "Della and the Dealer" and "Jealous Man") – T.J. Watson
 Austin City Limits (1979) – Himself
 The Dukes of Hazzard (1981, TV Series) – Himself
 Flo (1981) – Himself
 Seven Brides for Seven Brothers (1982, Season 1 (the only season), Episode 3, "Challenges," and Episode 8, "Rodeo," in which he sang "I Dream of Highways") – Cooper Johnson
 The Rousters (1983–1984) – Cactus Jack Slade
 Diff'rent Strokes (1984) – Sam's Father – Wes McKinney
 Domestic Life (1984) – Rip Steele
 Faerie Tale Theatre (1984, "Goldilocks and the Three Bears") – Forest Ranger
 Cover Up (1984) - John Cody
 Trapper John, M.D. (1985) - Jack Dearborne
 Dallas: The Early Years (1986, TV Movie) – Aaron Southworth
 Murder, She Wrote (1988) – Sheriff Tate
 Midnight Caller (1990) – Ralston Cash Dollar 
 Growing Pains (1990) – Claver Jackson
 Doorways (1993, TV series pilot) - Jake Mitchell

Several songs for the 1977 film Outlaw Blues were composed by Axton and sung by Peter Fonda.The Rousters was a short-lived television comedy adventure series (1983) with Axton as 'Cactus' Jack Slade. The show starred Chad Everett as Wyatt Earp III, the grandson of the legendary Wyatt Earp, and Jim Varney as his dim-witted brother, Evan.

In 1992 Axton narrated "The Alaska Highway: 1942-1992," a documentary on the history of the Alaska Highway which was produced by public television station KAKM of Anchorage and shown nationally on PBS. In the mid-1990s, Axton was chosen to host and narrate the profile series Life and Times on The Nashville Network, in which a different country music figure was spotlighted each hour. His voice was heard throughout and he was seen on-camera doing the introduction and closing of each show in which he participated.

Axton also showed up as the narrator for two documentaries of the Western States 100 Mile Endurance Race in 1982 and 1983 called Desperate Dreams''.

References

External links

 
 
 
 
 
 
 Hoyt Axton at Oklahoma Country Music Hall of Fame
 

1938 births
1999 deaths
People from Duncan, Oklahoma
Country musicians from Oklahoma
Military personnel from Oklahoma
American country singer-songwriters
American male film actors
American male singer-songwriters
American male television actors
American blues guitarists
American blues singers
American folk singers
American rock singers
American acoustic guitarists
American rock guitarists
American folk guitarists
Male actors from Oklahoma
United States Navy sailors
Musicians from Jacksonville, Florida
Robert E. Lee High School (Jacksonville) alumni
People from Victor, Montana
Vee-Jay Records artists
20th-century American male actors
Writers from Jacksonville, Florida
20th-century American singers
Singer-songwriters from Florida
Songwriters from Montana
Singer-songwriters from Oklahoma
Guitarists from Florida
Guitarists from Montana
Guitarists from Oklahoma
American male guitarists
20th-century American guitarists
Boren family
Country musicians from Florida
20th-century American male singers